The enzyme glycerophosphoinositol glycerophosphodiesterase (EC 3.1.4.44) catalyzes the reaction

1-(sn-glycero-3-phospho)-1D-myoinositol + H2O  myo-inositol + sn-glycerol 3-phosphate

This enzyme belongs to the family of hydrolases, specifically those acting on phosphoric diester bonds.  The systematic name is 1-(sn-glycero-3-phospho)-1D-myo-inositol glycerophosphohydrolase. Other names in common use include sn-glycero(3)phosphoinositol glycerophosphohydrolase, and ''sn''-glycero-3-phospho-1-inositol glycerophosphohydrolase.

References

 

EC 3.1.4
Enzymes of unknown structure